Cristian Osvaldo González Bautista (born 26 February 1998) is a Mexican professional footballer who plays as a defender for Tepatitlán.

Honours
Tepatitlán
Liga de Expansión MX: Guardianes 2021
Campeón de Campeones: 2021

References

External links

1998 births
Living people
Mexican footballers
Atlas F.C. footballers
C.D. Veracruz footballers
Dorados de Sinaloa footballers
Liga MX players
Ascenso MX players
Liga Premier de México players
Tercera División de México players
Association football defenders
Footballers from Guanajuato